Hemiarius harmandi is a species of catfish in the family Ariidae. It was described by Henri Émile Sauvage in 1880. It inhabits marine and freshwaters in Cambodia, Myanmar, Malaysia, Thailand and Vietnam.

References

Ariidae
Fish described in 1880